Heroic Sons and Daughters may refer to:

 Heroic Sons and Daughters, Xu Xingzhi's 1935 Chinese film
 Heroic Sons and Daughters, Wu Zhaodi's 1964 Chinese film